This is a list of regular season and tournament champions in men's basketball of the National Collegiate Athletic Association (NCAA) Division I Southern Conference.

Champions by year

Divisional format
The Southern Conference split into a divisional format for basketball beginning with the 1994–95 season.

Return to single table
Starting with the 2013–14 season, the Southern Conference abandoned the divisional format.

Tournament championships by school

Current members

Former members

| Georgia
| 1
| 1932
|}

Television coverage

See also
 Southern Conference women's basketball tournament

References 

 
Champions
Basketball in the United States lists